The members of the 36th Manitoba Legislature were elected in the Manitoba general election held in April 1995. The legislature sat from May 23, 1995, to August 17, 1999.

The Progressive Conservative Party led by Gary Filmon formed the government.

Gary Doer of the New Democratic Party was Leader of the Opposition.

Louise Dacquay served as speaker for the assembly.

There were five sessions of the 36th Legislature:

Yvon Dumont was Lieutenant Governor of Manitoba until March 2, 1999, when Peter Liba became lieutenant governor.

Members of the Assembly 
The following members were elected to the assembly in 1995:

Notes:

By-elections 
By-elections were held to replace members for various reasons:

Notes:

References 

Terms of the Manitoba Legislature
1995 establishments in Manitoba
1999 disestablishments in Manitoba